SuREvival is the fourth studio album of Polish progressive rock group Quidam, released 2005. It is the first album after singer Emilia Derkowska and the whole rhythm section, bassist Radek Scholl and
drummer Rafał Jermakow, left the band.

Track listing 
All songs have been composed by Zbysek Florek, Bartek Kossowicz,  Maciek Meller, Maciek Wróblewski and Mariusz Ziólkowski.
 "Airing" – 2:25
 "Hands Off" – 9:25
 "Not So Close" – 6:22
 "The Fifth Season" – 9:45
 "SurREvival" – 5:13
 "Queen of Moulin Rouge" – 8:24
 "Everything's Ended" – 13:14

Personnel 

 Zbyszek Florek – keyboards,  mixing
 Maciek Meller – guitars
 Bartek Kossowicz – vocals, backing vocals
 Mariusz Ziółkowski – bass guitar
 Maciek Wróblewski – drums
 Jacek Zasada – flutes

Guests 
 Robert "Myca" Kowalski – backing vocals "Hands off", "Not so close", "The fifth season"
 Grzegorz Nadolny – double-bass "The fifth season"   
 Paweł "DJ Paulo" Molenda – scratching "Queen of Moulin Rouge"

References

2005 albums
Quidam (band) albums